Pepin, Peppin, or Pippin of Aquitaine may refer to:
Pepin I of Aquitaine (797 – 838), King of Aquitaine
Pepin II of Aquitaine (823 – after 864), King of Aquitaine, son of Pepin I